Jonathan P. Folsom (October 9, 1820 – February 23, 1893) served as the twentieth Mayor of Lowell, Massachusetts.

Business career
Folsom was, for many years, involved in the dry goods trade.  Folsom had a dry goods store on Merrimack Street, in Lowell.

Folsom was a director of the Old Lowell National Bank,  and a Trustee of the Central Savings Bank.

Public service career
Folsom was a member of the Lowell Common Council, Board of Aldermen, and was twice elected the mayor of Lowell.
 
After he was mayor Folsom served two terms in the Massachusetts legislature as a member of the Massachusetts House of Representatives.

See also
 1872 Massachusetts legislature

References

1820 births
1893 deaths
Lowell, Massachusetts City Council members
Mayors of Lowell, Massachusetts
People from Tamworth, New Hampshire
Members of the Massachusetts House of Representatives
19th-century American politicians